A schulklopfer (or shulklopfer) is the person who calls a Jewish community to prayer in the local synagogue. In modern times, the custom has more or less died out due to the creation of alarm clocks and technology, but it was historically common.

The schulklopfer was usually a beadle, who would perform the task by wandering around the community, knocking on each household's door early in the morning. In Neustadt, he would knock four times, in the pattern KNOCK…pause…KNOCK, KNOCK…pause…KNOCK. Israel Isserlein, a famous rabbi from Neustadt, argued that this pattern encoded the biblical phrase, I shall come to thee and bless thee (in gematria, the letters of the first word of this phrase have the values 1, 2, and 1, respectively). In the Rhine, the custom was to strike merely thrice, in the pattern KNOCK…pause…KNOCK, KNOCK. 

In mediaeval Eastern Europe, the schulklopfer also had the role of individually inviting people to marriage ceremonies (nissuin); the invitations were made to the entire community by the schulklopfer on the morning of the marriage ceremony itself (such ceremonies were usually an evening affair).

The name stems from the Holy Roman Empire (Germany) in the middle ages. Christians in nearby communities sometimes referred to schulklopfers as campanatores (a Latin term meaning bell-strikers) or as Glöckner (German for bell-striker).

See also
Muezzin (the Islamic equivalent)
Klopfer surname

Reference Notes

External links
 Jewish Encyclopedia: “Schulklopfer” by Cyrus Adler and Max Seligsohn (1906).

Jewish religious occupations